The Dambulla Aura (DA) is a franchise cricket team that competes in 2022 Lanka Premier League. The team is based in Dambulla, Central Province, Sri Lanka. In September 2021, Dambulla Viiking changed their name to Dambulla Giants after having new owners. In 2022 Dambulla team changed their name to Dambulla Aura. The team was captained by Dasun Shanaka and coached by Mickey Arthur.

Current squad
 Players with international caps are listed in bold.

Administration and support staff

Teams and standings

League table

League stage

References 

2022 Lanka Premier League
Lanka Premier League
Dambulla Aura